Gondamakar (also Romanized as Gondamaḵār) was a village in Kut-e Abdollah Rural District, in the Central District of Karun County, Khuzestan Province, Iran. At the 2006 census, its population was 3,811, in 730 families. The village was merged with 8 other into one city called Kut-e Abdollah.

References 

Former populated places in Karun County